Hale railway station serves the area of Hale in the south of Altrincham, Greater Manchester, England. It is also used by people living in the surrounding areas of Bowdon and Hale Barns. The station is located on Ashley Road. It is on the Mid-Cheshire line, from Chester to Manchester Piccadilly.

History

The station was opened as Peel Causeway by the Cheshire Midland Railway (CMR) on 12 May 1862 when the railway opened from Altrincham to Knutsford. The CMR was amalgamated into the Cheshire Lines Committee (CLC) on 15 August 1867. The station became Peel Causeway for Hale on 1 January 1899, and on 1 January 1902 it was renamed Hale. The station was served by passenger trains from Manchester Central to Northwich and Chester Northgate. The CLC remained an independent entity, as a joint London, Midland & Scottish Railway and London & North Eastern Railway operation after the Grouping of 1923, until the creation of British Railways (BR). The station then passed on to the London Midland Region of British Railways on nationalisation on 1 January 1948. When Sectorisation was introduced in the 1980s, the station was served by Regional Railways under arrangement with the Greater Manchester PTE until the privatisation of British Railways.

Facilities
The current station has a ticket office at Platform 1, which is open on weekday mornings. A ticket vending machine is in place for purchase of tickets outside of these hours and for the collection of pre-paid tickets. Digital station information boards are in operation on both platforms along public announcements. Car parking is available either side of the level crossing. A veterinarian surgery now occupies most of the station building on Platform 1 while there is a health clinic on Platform 2. The signal box is not in use any more.

Services
The through service to  ceased to run from 15 December 2008.

Through passengers had to use the Metrolink service to continue their journey (connections were advertised in the 2007-8 timetable and National Rail tickets were valid for through trips). From December 2008 however, the service frequency has been improved (to two-hourly each way) and through running to Stockport and Manchester Piccadilly reinstated for the first time since the early nineties.

References

Further reading

External links

 Mid-Cheshire Community Rail Partnership

Railway stations in Trafford
DfT Category E stations
Former Cheshire Lines Committee stations
Northern franchise railway stations
Railway stations in Great Britain opened in 1862